A stenter (sometimes called a tenter) is a specialist oven used in the textile industry for drying and heat treating fabric after wet processing.

It consists of heated chambers, adjustable to the width of the fabric being treated. Fabric is fed into the heated chamber supported at either selvedge by a series of stenter pins or clamps which support the fabric as it is moved through the drying chambers. (Note: Stenter pins are the modern equivalent of tenterhooks)

The input and output speed of the fabric is closely controlled, as is the output width, determining the moisture content of the fabric after drying, and the dimensional stability.

Etymology and History 

Stenter is derived from tenter, which comes from the Latin tendere, to stretch, via a French intermediate. The main purpose of the machine is to stretch and dry. The frames were called tenters and the tentering hooks were the metal hooks used for holding the fabric to the frame. Tenters were used to process woolen fabric. In the cleaning process, after squeezing excess water, the crumpled woolen cloth needed to be straightened and dried under tension or it would shrink. The wet cloth was stretched on a large wooden frame, a tenter, and left to dry. The lengths of wet cloth were stretched on the tenter using hooks (nails driven through the wood) all around the perimeter of the frame to which the cloth's edges were fixed. This ensured that, as it dried, the cloth would retain its shape and size. When Higher Mill was built, the tentering was done in the open air; the tenter frames were erected on the hillside to the east of the mill. Towards the end of World War I, the process was brought inside and dried by steam heating. Slowly, it turned into a modern-day stenter machine.

Holding hook types 

 Pins
 Clips

Uses
A stenter is a very useful machine in a textile process house, and the machine plays a vital role in finishing. The machine may be equipped with a padding mangle, which is useful in squeezing excess moisture and applying various finishes  such as wrinkle-free, water repellent, waterproof, anti-static, or flame retardant. Coating and dyeing applications are also possible on a stenter machine with suitable padders and coating attachments.

There are various optional attachments such as a tendamatic, weft straightener, bowing and skew cameras, or ones that can affect over-feeding, edge gumming and trimming, or residual moisture control which help increase its functionality and usage. A stenter is primarily used for the following:

Drying and adjustment of the width.
Application of softeners and various chemical finishes. Most of the textile finishes are applied to the stenter machine. Regular softeners that specialize finishes are applied with wet-to-wet or dry-to-wet finishing modes. The dry-to-wet finishing route is preferred where more of the chemical is required.
Curing, stenter is used in curing the fabrics treated with certain chemicals such as resins and many other crosslinking polymers. Depending upon the requirements, there are two methods of curing the materials. The first is during drying, and another is after drying with another passage, maintaining a certain speed and temperature on the machine. The process of curing improves in fixing the fabrics for creases ( wrinkle free ), shape memory, and dimensional stability, etc.
Adjusting overfeed GSM (grams per square meter), and manipulating the courses and wales, or the picks and ends, in knitted and woven fabrics, respectively. 
Controlling shrinkage by overfeeding/increasing input and controlling output speeds.
Heatsetting both pre-heatsetting and post-heatsetting of the fabrics. Heatsetting helps in stabilizing synthetic fabrics such as polyester, nylon, and spandex.
Bowing and skew control especially in stripe fabrics.
Color applications.

See also
 Tenterhook

References

Machines
Textile mills
Textile industry
Textile engineering